Balkumari may refer to: 
Balkumari, Bhaktapur
Balkumari, Nuwakot
Balkumari temple
Balkumari temple, Bhaktapur